is a Japanese basketball coach. He was the head coach of the Japan national basketball team from 2014 until his resignation in late 2016.

Hasegawa coached the Japanese Universiade team at the 2007 Summer Universiade in Bangkok, Thailand and the Aoyama Gakuin University basketball team. He led Aoyama to a quarter-finals appearance at the 2013 Emperor's Cup after beating Levanga Hokkaido.

Head coaching record

|- 
| style="text-align:left;"|Link Tochigi Brex
| style="text-align:left;"|2017
| 13||4||9|||| style="text-align:center;"|Fired|||-||-||-||
| style="text-align:center;"|
|-

References

Japanese basketball coaches
1960 births
Living people
Aoyama Gakuin University alumni
Japan national basketball team coaches
Utsunomiya Brex coaches